The 2022–23 UTEP Miners men's basketball team represented the University of Texas at El Paso during the 2022–23 NCAA Division I men's basketball season. The team was led by second-year head coach Joe Golding, and played their home games at the Don Haskins Center in El Paso, Texas as a member of Conference USA.

Previous season
The Miners finished the 2021–22 season 20–14, 11–7 in C-USA play to finish in fourth place in West Division. They defeated Old Dominion in the second round of the C-USA tournament before losing to Middle Tennessee in the quarterfinals. They were invited to The Basketball Classic where they defeated Western Illinois before losing to Southern Utah in the second round.

Offseason

Departures

Incoming transfers

Recruiting classes

2022 recruiting class

2023 recruiting class

Roster

Schedule and results

|-
!colspan=12 style=| Non-conference regular season

|-
!colspan=12 style=|Conference USA tournament

Source

References

UTEP Miners men's basketball seasons
UTEP Miners
UTEP Miners men's basketball
UTEP Miners men's basketball